The English Settlement School is a school building in Oakland, Oregon, in the United States. The building was constructed in 1910 and was added to the National Register of Historic Places on September 4, 2007.

See also
 National Register of Historic Places listings in Douglas County, Oregon

References

External links
 English Settlement School (Oakland, Oregon) , UO Libraries

1910 establishments in Oregon
National Register of Historic Places in Douglas County, Oregon
School buildings completed in 1910
School buildings on the National Register of Historic Places in Oregon